Maybelle D. Goodlander (1882 – October 25, 1959) was an American commercial and portrait photographer based in Muncie, Indiana, in partnership with her older sister Maude Goodlander.

Early life
Maude and Maybelle Goodlander were born in Muncie, Indiana, the daughters of Marquis D. Goodlander and Harriett Chapel Goodlander. Their father was a photographer, and taught his daughters the skills of the profession.

Career
By 1906 the Goodlander sisters were working together as professional photographers, and they took over their father's studio when he retired. They made photographic portraits and painted portraits on canvas. They also took class pictures for schools. They also held an exhibit of German photography in Muncie, in 1911, featuring work by Minya Diez-Dührkoop.

Maybelle Goodlander was elected president of the Women's Federation of the Photographers' Association of America in 1915. She attended national meetings of the Photographers' Association of America in Milwaukee (1910), St. Paul (1911), Detroit (1912), Kansas City, Missouri (1913), Atlanta (1914), and Indianapolis (1915).  She was president of the Business and Professional Women's Association of Muncie in 1927. She spoke about photography at the national convention of Business and Professional Women's Clubs in Oakland, California in 1927.

Personal life
Maybelle D. Goodlander died in 1959, aged 77 years. Maude died in 1962.

References

External links
 Stereograph Collection ca. 1860-1939, Manuscript and Visual Collections Department, William Henry Smith Memorial Library, Indiana Historical Society; Series 23 contains work by Marquis D. Goodlander, including images of the Goodlander Sisters as children.
 

1882 births
1959 deaths
20th-century American women photographers
20th-century American photographers
People from Muncie, Indiana
20th-century American businesswomen
20th-century American businesspeople